The Teen Brigade is either of two distinct fictional teams appearing in American comic books published by Marvel Comics. Both teams were recruited by Rick Jones from young amateur radio enthusiasts in order to obtain and divulge strategic information about safety hazards, usually involving the Hulk. These teams were attempting to aid the HUlk in using his super strength for good. They knew he, the Hulk, just desired to help citizens, and did not intend to harm them. The first group was founded in The Incredible Hulk #6 (March 1963). Today, a lot of adolescents are unaware of the Teen Brigade teams. Unless they have access to original comic books, the only Hulk character they may be aware of is in more modern shows or movies.

Overview
The rationale for creating such teams was that with their help Rick Jones could reach the Hulk (and occasionally other people or events of interest) faster, possibly in time to help him avoid fights or other incidents that could bring the Hulk trouble. 

The first Teen Brigade was formed by Rick in The Incredible Hulk #6 (March 1963), and they helped build a weapon for the Hulk to defeat the Metal Master. The group played a role in the origin of the Avengers in The Avengers #1, because it was the tampering of a radio transmission the Brigade intended to send to the Fantastic Four that brought the original Avengers (Thor, Iron Man, Wasp and Ant-Man) together to fight the Hulk. The Avengers and the Fantastic Four were a part of keeping Hulk in check, as well as the Teen Brigade.  In The Avengers #2 (November 1963), they called Giant-Man (Hank Pym) to help defeat a Space Phantom. They contacted the Avengers to notify them about the whereabouts of the rampaging Hulk in The Avengers #3 (January 1964). In The Avengers #4 (March 1964), the team helped Rick and Captain America track down a villain who turned the Avengers into stone. Captain America showed off his acrobatics abilities to the Teen Brigade in The Avengers #5 (May 1964). They later freed the Avengers when they had been imprisoned inside Kang's ship by pretending they wanted to join Kang, then dropping an energy cylinder to distract the time-traveller.

The second Teen Brigade was assembled at a time when the Hulk was under the Corruptor's control.  In an eerie parallel to the Avengers' origin, the Corruptor's own equipment interfered with a transmission meant for the Avengers and instead reached a handful of south western superheroes, giving birth to the superteam known as the Rangers. The Corrupter controlled the minds of others by producing sweat glands that held power inside. It would be as if a manipulative person convinced someone to do something without external things being in question.

The Teen Brigade was mentioned as an inspiration by Captain America when he decided to create an online network in stories published in the early 1990s.

A third version of the Teen Brigade appear in the 2011 series Vengeance composed of Barnell Bohusk, Angel Salvadore, the In-Betweener and two new heroes: America Chavez and the Ultimate Nullifier. It seems like the Teen Brigade is attempting to make a comeback.

References

External links

Marvel Comics superhero teams